Durnești is a commune in Botoșani County, Western Moldavia, Romania. It is composed of six villages: Băbiceni, Bârsănești, Broșteni, Cucuteni, Durnești and Guranda.

References

Communes in Botoșani County
Localities in Western Moldavia